Aleksandr Aleksandrovich Menkov (born 7 December 1990 in Minusinsk, Krasnoyarsk Krai) is a Russian athlete who competes in the long jump.

Career 
Menkov set a personal best of 8.16 metres in Kemerovo in June 2009. He won the gold medal at the 2009 European Junior Championships, and competed at the 2009 World Championships without qualifying for the final. At his season opener in January 2011, the Siberian regional championships, he improved his personal best by one centimetre to 8.17 metres. The highlight of this season was a 6th place at the 2011 World Championships. At the 2012 Olympic Games, he placed 11th.

Menkov won gold at the 2013 World Championships with a new Russian national record of 8.56 metres.

Achievements

References 

1990 births
Living people
People from Minusinsk
Sportspeople from Krasnoyarsk Krai
Russian male long jumpers
Olympic male long jumpers
Olympic athletes of Russia
Athletes (track and field) at the 2012 Summer Olympics
Universiade medalists in athletics (track and field)
Universiade silver medalists for Russia
Medalists at the 2013 Summer Universiade
World Athletics Championships athletes for Russia
Authorised Neutral Athletes at the World Athletics Championships
World Athletics Championships winners
World Athletics Championships medalists
European Athletics Championships winners
Russian Athletics Championships winners
Diamond League winners